Arak Airport  is an international airport in Arak, the capital of Markazi Province in Iran. The airport, one of the oldest in Iran, was opened in 1938.

History

The airport was established by the Britain in 1938 and named Sultanabad (the former name of Arak). Following the establishment of the consulates of England, Germany, and Switzerland and companies such as Ziegler & Co. in Arak, the British thought of establishing an airport due to the city's distance from the sea and maritime facilities as well as major airports. 

During World War II, the airport was used by Britain and its allies for military purposes.

With the arrival of a Boeing 707 aircraft carrying the former President of Iran, Mahmoud Ahmadinejad on June 9th, 2013, Arak airport was officially re-opened along with a new runway and apron. The runway, 3,700 meters long and over 75 meters wide, has all the facilities for the takeoff and landing of all classes of aircraft.

Airlines and destinations

Statistics

References

External links

Arak, Iran
Airports in Iran
Airports established in 1938
World War II airfields in Iran
Buildings and structures in Markazi Province
Transportation in Markazi Province

Transport in Arak